The tui parakeet (Brotogeris sanctithomae) is a species of bird in subfamily Arinae of the family Psittacidae, the African and New World parrots. It is found in Bolivia, Brazil, Colombia, Peru, and possibly Ecuador.

Taxonomy and systematics

The tui parakeet shares genus Brotogeris with seven other species of parakeets. It has two subspecies, the nominate B. s. sanctithomae (Müller, 1776) and B. s. takatsukasae (Neumann, 1931).

Description

Adults are mostly green that is yellower on the rump and underparts. They have yellow lores and forehead and a bluish tinge on the face. Their primaries are a darker green than the body and bluish on their underside. Their bill is brown. Subspecies B. s. takatsukasae differs from the nominate only by adding a yellow streak behind the eye. Immature birds are essentially the same as adults.

Distribution and habitat

The nominate subspecies of the tui parakeet is found in the Amazon Basin of extreme southeastern Colombia, eastern Peru, northern Bolivia, and Brazil east to the Rio Madeira. Undocumented sight records in eastern Ecuador lead the South American Classification Committee of the American Ornithological Society to treat it as hypothetical in that country. Subspecies B. s. takatsukasae is found along the lower Amazon from the Rio Madeira and Rio Negro to the Atlantic at the Amazon's mouth. The species mostly inhabits semi-open landscapes like secondary forest, grasslands with some woodlands, riverbanks and islands with dense scrub, and the edges of várzea forest.

Behavior

Movement

The tui parakeet is believed to be sedentary.

Feeding

The tui parakeet feeds on fruit and blossoms from a variety of plants including palms. It also feeds in manioc and sugarcane plantations.

Breeding

The tui parakeet's breeding season is not well defined but appears to be April to July in Colombia. Nest cavities in arboreal termite nests have been documented. One nest held six nestlings. The typical range of clutch size, the incubation period, the time to fledging, and details of parental care are not known.

Vocalization

The tui parakeet's calls include "a high-pitched “klee”, shrill “chree” or bisyllabic “chree-chree” [and a] fast chattering series “cra-cra-cra-cra-cra”."  Members of a flock often call simultaneously.

Status

The IUCN has assessed the tui parakeet as being of Least Concern. It has a large range, and though its population size is not known it is believed to be stable. No immediate threats have been identified. "Locally abundant with very little habitat loss, Brazil, and equally common within the limited areas occupied in Colombia, Peru and Bolivia."

References

External links
Tui parakeet photo gallery VIREO 
Stamps (for Brazil) minor showing of bird Article "Bird Stamps of Brazil"
Photo-Medium Res; Article lib.Montana.edu—"Brotogeris"

tui parakeet
Birds of the Amazon Basin
Birds of the Peruvian Amazon
Birds of the Bolivian Amazon
tui parakeet
Birds of Brazil
Taxonomy articles created by Polbot

 -->